The Oregon State Beavers wrestling program was established in 1909, competing in collegiate wrestling across 95 seasons since then.  Traditionally a national powerhouse, the Beavers won the Amateur Athletic Union national championship in 1926 (Oregon State's first national championship in any sport) and have won their conference championship 52 times.  The team has produced 99 All-Americans, 12 individual national champions, and is associated with five National Wrestling Hall of Fame members.  The team has finished their season ranked in the NCAA top 25 on 43 occasions, including finishing 20 seasons in the top 10 and two seasons as national runners-up.

Chris Pendleton (Oklahoma State) is the head coach.  It will be his first season in 2020–21. He replaces Jim Zalesky.  In his 12 years at Oregon State, Zalesky coached 12 All-Americans, won seven Pac-12 Championships, and compiled a 99-40-2 record while coaching the team to four top 25 finishes including two top 10 finishes.

Dan Hodge Trophy Winners
The Dan Hodge Trophy is awarded to the nation's top wrestler each season.
 1996 - Les Gutches

National Wrestling Hall of Fame members
OSU is associated with five members of the National Wrestling Hall of Fame.
 Robin Reed - Inducted 1978 (wrestler and coach for OSU)
 Dale Thomas - Inducted 1980 (coach for OSU)
 Jim Zalesky - Inducted 2004 (coach for OSU)
 Les Gutches - Inducted 2009 (wrestler for OSU)
 Greg Strobel - Inducted 2012 (wrestler for OSU)

Oregon Sports Hall of Fame members
Oregon State Wrestling is associated with six members of the Oregon Sports Hall of Fame
 Chester Newton - Inducted 1980
 Robin Reed - Inducted 1980
 Jess Lewis - Inducted 1981
 Ron Finley - Inducted 1982
 Dale Thomas - Inducted 1991
 Les Gutches - Inducted 2011

Individual National Champions
OSU wrestlers have won 12 individual national championships.
 1961 - Don Conway (167 pounds)
 1969 - Jess Lewis (Heavyweight)
 1970 - Jess Lewis (Heavyweight)
 1971 - Roger Weigel (134 pounds)
 1973 - Greg Strobel (190 pounds)
 1974 - Greg Strobel (190 pounds)
 1975 - Larry Bielenberg (Heavyweight)
 1978 - Dan Hicks (142 pounds)
 1979 - Dan Hicks (142 pounds)
 1980 - Howard Harris (Heavyweight)
 1995 - Les Gutches (177 pounds)
 1996 - Les Gutches (177 pounds)

All-Americans
OSU has 99 All-Americans.
 1952 - John Witte (Heavyweight)
 1957 - John Dustin (177 pounds)
 1958 - John Dustin (177 pounds)
 1960 - Mits Tamura (115 pounds)
 1961 - Don Conway (167 pounds), Ron Finley (137 pounds)
 1964 - Len Kauffman (167 pounds)
 1965 - Len Kauffman (167 pounds)
 1966 - Ron Iwasaki (115 pounds)
 1967 - Jeff Smith (167 pounds), Ron Iwasaki (115 pounds)
 1968 - Jess Lewis (Heavyweight)
 1969 - Jess Lewis (Heavyweight), Phil Frey (145 pounds), Jim Vandehey (167 pounds), Bob Hawkins (137 pounds), Kim Snider (152 pounds)
 1970 - Jess Lewis (Heavyweight), Jim Crumley (177 pounds), Roger Weigel (126 pounds), Bob Tomasovic (150 pounds), Jim Vandehey (167 pounds), Kim Snider (158 pounds)
 1971 - Roger Weigel (134 pounds), Mike R. Jones (158 pounds), Jim Crumley (177 pounds)
 1972 - Tom Phillips (118 pounds), Greg Strobel (190 pounds), Jim Hagen (Heavyweight)
 1973 - Greg Strobel (190 pounds), Tom Phillips (118 pounds), Mike R. Jones (158 pounds), Jim Hagen (Heavyweight), Jim Crumley (177 pounds)
 1974 - Greg Strobel (190 pounds), Gordan Iiams (142 pounds), Larry Bielenberg (Heavyweight)
 1975 - Larry Bielenberg (Heavyweight), Doug Ziebart (150 pounds)
 1976 - Larry Bielenberg (Heavyweight)
 1977 - Larry Bielenberg (Heavyweight), Dick Knorr (142 pounds), Pat Plourd (118 Pounds), Marty Ryan (177 pounds), Howard Harris (190 pounds)
 1978 - Dan Hicks (142 pounds), Howard Harris (190 pounds)
 1979 - Dan Hicks (142 pounds), Dick Knorr (150 pounds), Howard Harris (190 pounds), Mark Evenhus (158 pounds), Mike Bauer (126 pounds)
 1980 - Howard Harris (Heavyweight), Mike Bauer (134 pounds)
 1981 - Marty Ryan (177 pounds), Brad Swartz (150 pounds)
 1983 - Jim Baumgardner (190 pounds)
 1984 - Jim Baumgardner (190 pounds)
 1986 - Jeff Cardwell (150 pounds)
 1987 - Jeff Cardwell (158 pounds)
 1988 - Dave Orndorff (Heavyweight)
 1991 - Babak Mohammadi (126 pounds)
 1992 - Babak Mohammadi (126 pounds), Trent Flack (167 pounds)
 1993 - Trent Flack (167 pounds), Dave Nieradka (126 pounds)
 1994 - Babak Mohammadi (134 pounds), Dan Alar (158 pounds), Les Gutches (177 pounds), Dave Nieradka (126 pounds)
 1995 - Les Gutches (177 pounds), Babak Mohammadi (134 pounds), Glenn Nieradka (126 pounds), Chad Renner (167 pounds)
 1996 - Les Gutches (177 pounds), Oscar Wood (134 pounds)
 1998 - Oscar Wood (142 pounds), Jason Buce (126 pounds)
 1999 - Mat Orndorff (Heavyweight)
 2001 - Eric Jorgensen (157 pounds)
 2002 - Nathan Coy (174 pounds)
 2007 - Ty Watterson (Heavyweight)
 2009 - Heinrich Barnes (149 pounds)
 2011 - Colby Covington (174 pounds)
 2012 - Clayton Jack (Heavyweight), Michael Mangrum (141 pounds), Scott Sakaguchi (149 pounds)
 2013 - Taylor Meeks (197 pounds), Scott Sakaguchi (149 pounds), RJ Pena (157 pounds)
 2016 - Amarveer Dhesi (Heavyweight)
 2018 - Amarveer Dhesi (Heavyweight), Ronnie Bresser (125 pounds)
 2019 - Amarveer Dhesi (Heavyweight), Ronnie Bresser (125 pounds)
 2022 - Grant Willits (141 pounds), Hunter Willits (157 pounds), Brandon Kaylor (125 pounds), Devan Turner (133 pounds)

Notable Oregon State Beaver wrestlers

References

External links
Larry Bielenberg Oral History Interview

 
1909 establishments in Oregon
Sports clubs established in 1909